This article contains information about the literary events and publications of 1523.

Events
June 9 – Simon de Colines, a Paris printer, is fined for printing Commentarii initiatorii in quatuor Evangelia, a Biblical commentary by Jacques Lefèvre d'Étaples, without approval from the Paris Faculty of Theology.
Laurentian Library in Florence commissioned from Michelangelo by the Medici Pope Clement VII.

New books
Pietro Aron – 
Jacques Lefèvre d'Étaples – Nouveau Testament, translation of the New Testament into French
Anthony Fitzherbert

The Boke of Husbandrie
The Boke of Surveyinge and Improvements
Martin Luther
, translation of the Pentateuch into German
The Adoration of the Sacrament
Maximilianus Transylvanus – De Moluccis Insulis, the first published account of the Magellan–Elcano circumnavigation

New poetry

Alexander Barclay – The Mirror of Good Manners, translating Dominic Mancini's De quatuor virtutibus (approximate date)
Hans Sachs – Die Wittenbergische Nachtigall (The Wittenberg Nightingale)
John Skelton – The Garland of Laurel

New drama
Farsa de Inês Pereira (The Farce of Inez Pereira)

Births
February 13 – Valentin Naboth, German mathematician, astronomer and astrologer (died 1593)
February 20 – Jan Blahoslav, Czech Christian humanist writer (died 1571)
March 16 – Antoine Rodolphe Chevallier, French Protestant Hebraist, tutor of Queen Elizabeth I of England (died 1572)
March 21 – Kaspar Eberhard, German theologian (died 1575)
unknown date – Girolamo Maggi, Italian polymath (died 1572)

Deaths
August 29 – Ulrich von Hutten, German scholar, poet and reformer (born 1488)
October – William Cornysh, dramatist, poet, actor and composer (born 1465)
unknown date – Stephen Hawes, English poet (born c. 1474)

References

1523

1523 books
Years of the 16th century in literature